The Progress-Index is a daily newspaper published in Petersburg, Virginia. Its print edition is published Monday through Sunday morning, and its website is updated regularly throughout the day with breaking news, feature stories, photographs and videos.

History 
The paper's roots trace to 1865, but its current moniker came about through the early-1920s merger of the Index-Appeal and the Evening Progress. It was owned by various Petersburg businessmen until 1959, when Thomson Newspapers of Canada purchased it. Thomson owned The Progress-Index until 1997, when it sold it to Times-Shamrock Communications, a privately held media company based in Scranton, Pennsylvania. Its current building, at 15 Franklin St. in downtown Petersburg, was built in 1921, along with what was then a state-of-the-art press. This was before the merger of the two papers into The Index-Appeal & Evening Progress, shortened to The Progress-Index in 1923. In 2014, Times-Shamrock sold The Progress-Index to New Media Investment Group.

The P-I was a "true" afternoon paper Monday through Saturday until 2005, when its production schedule switched to that of a typical morning paper, in that the pages were laid out and prepared for printing the night before. It remained different from other a.m. papers in one respect, in that, Monday through Friday, the press didn't run until the morning of the day the paper came out, at about 9:30. The paper was distributed in the late morning and early afternoon, Monday through Friday, and the Saturday edition was a true morning paper, in that it was printed the night before. The Sunday paper has always been done that way. Normally, the only time the P-I took advantage of the fact that it printed in the morning was on Election Day, when voters were pictured at the polls. Other than that, only exceptional circumstances caused the P-I to print something that happened on the day the paper was distributed.

The Progress-Index is a morning paper, six days a week. It is printed at night, for distribution the following morning.

In January 2018, after the closing of the Hopewell News and Mid VA Trading Post by owners Lancaster Media, The Progress-Index launched the twice weekly Hopewell Herald/Prince George Post and weekly classified Mid VA Trader. Additionally, in February 2018, after the Virginia Dealer magazine was discontinued, GateHouse Media Mid-Virginia Holdings launched the Virginia Wheels magazine in its place. One of the newest offerings from this publishing company is the Fort Lee Traveller, which was formerly published under government contract through Marcoa Publishing. In May 2018, the contract was awarded to the company and began publication. The County Register is the last publication to come to light from the Progress, serving additional surrounding counties. Late in 2019, citing decreases in circulation and advertising, the Herald-Post and the County Register stopped publishing.

On November 14, 2019, the boards of directors of GateHouse Media and Gannett Co. Inc. approved a merger of the two companies under the Gannett banner. The $1.13 billion deal created the largest daily newspaper chain in the nation. Under a single Gannett name, the company began undergoing some structure changes, including the elimination of the traditional "publisher" position in favor of separate silos covering news content, advertising content and business matters. The merger created a sibling partnership between The Progress-Index, a former GateHouse newspaper, and The News Leader in Staunton, Virginia, a longtime Gannett-held newspaper.

On July 27, 2020, The Progress-Index launched an all-new website with progress-index.com. It also began its new business model of a digital-first news content platform, with all news content, including breaking news and in-depth investigative pieces, appearing on the digital platforms first before appearing in the print versions. That move reflected a national trend in local journalism where people were relying much more on their electronic devices to read news and information in formats best suited to their daily lives. Over the next year, the newspaper has plans to significantly boost its digital subscription numbers.

On August 31, 2020, the circulation and production departments of The Progress-Index were outsourced to Lee Enterprises, owner and operator of the Richmond Times-Dispatch and other Virginia newspapers, as part of a Gannett corporate initiative. For the first time in the newspaper's history, it would not be printed and circulated from its downtown Petersburg headquarters on Franklin Street. The official "last run" of the newspaper on the Petersburg presses was August 30, 2020.

References

External links 
Official site
Mondotimes profile

Gannett publications
Daily newspapers published in Virginia
Publications established in 1865
Petersburg, Virginia
1865 establishments in Virginia